List of the provincial governors (ผู้ว่าราชการจังหวัด) of Lop Buri Province, Thailand.

Comment: Till 1941 the Thai year began on April 1, thus some of the years in the table above may be off by one

References
List of Lop Buri Governors

Lop Buri
Lopburi province

Governors of Lop Buri